"Rooting for You" is a song by English trio London Grammar. The song was released by Ministry of Sound and Sony Music in the United Kingdom on 1 January 2017 as the lead single from their second studio album Truth Is a Beautiful Thing (2017), the song has peaked at number 58 on the UK Singles Chart. It was written by the three members of London Grammar, and produced by Paul Epworth and MyRiot.

Music video
The music video for the song was directed by Bison, where two minutes of the song are performed a cappella. The video edit was produced by Sonya Sier and Zoe Wheeler.

Track listing

Charts

Release history

References

2017 singles
2017 songs
London Grammar songs
Ministry of Sound singles
Sony Music singles
Songs written by Hannah Reid
Songs written by Dan Rothman
Songs written by Dominic Major